Garevac is a village in the municipality of Modriča, Republika Srpska, Bosnia and Herzegovina.

References

External links
garevac.info

Populated places in Modriča